Pablo Leonardo Caballero Cáceres (born 25 June 1972, in Asunción) is a Paraguayan football manager and former player who played as a striker.

Career
Caballero had a well-traveled playing career, appearing for clubs in Chile, Mexico and Peru. He played for 15 different clubs before leaving 3 de Febrero in 2006, after a dispute with manager Alicio Solalinde.

In 2003, Primera División de México side Puebla canceled his contract, ending a seven-year stint playing abroad, so Caballero returned to Paraguay to play for Cerro Porteño.

After he retired from playing, Caballero became a football coach. In December 2008, he was appointed to manage 3 de Febrero, his first coaching position with professional club.

References

External links

1972 births
Living people
Paraguayan footballers
Paraguay international footballers
Cerro Porteño players
Club Guaraní players
Club Universidad Nacional footballers
Club Puebla players
Real Sociedad de Zacatecas footballers
Club Deportivo Palestino footballers
Cobreloa footballers
C.D. Huachipato footballers
Alianza Atlético footballers
Everton de Viña del Mar footballers
Club Deportivo Universidad Católica footballers
Club Atlético 3 de Febrero players
Liga MX players
Ascenso MX players
Expatriate footballers in Chile
Expatriate footballers in Mexico
Expatriate footballers in Peru
Expatriate footballers in Argentina
Association football forwards
Resistencia S.C. managers
Club Nacional managers
12 de Octubre Football Club managers
Sportivo Luqueño managers
Deportivo Capiatá managers
Deportivo Santaní managers
Independiente F.B.C. managers